The R165 road is a regional road in Ireland, linking the R188  west of Cootehill in County Cavan to the N2 near Ardee, County Louth. 

Route
Northeast to southwest, the route starts at a junction with the R188 west of Cootehill. It continues southwards through Stradone, to join the N3 and in 500 m leaves the N3 at Lavey.  

See also
Roads in Ireland
National primary road
National secondary road

References
Roads Act 1993 (Classification of Regional Roads) Order 2006 – Department of Transport

Regional roads in the Republic of Ireland
Roads in County Cavan
Roads in County Louth